Ancylometis isophaula is a species of moth in the family Oecophoridae. It is known from Madagascar.

This species has a wingspan of 10 mm for the male.

This species is allied to Ancylometis scaeocosma.

References

Moths described in 1934
Oecophoridae
Moths of Madagascar
Endemic fauna of Madagascar